Nicholas Eadie (born 1958) is an Australian television, film and theatre actor.

Biography
Born in Sydney, New South Wales to actor and Australian Broadcasting Commission radio announcer Mervyn Eadie, he attended Waverley College from 1968 to 1976, studied Arts at University of New England for one year in 1977, and studied at the National Institute of Dramatic Art from 1978 to 1980.

Television
Eadie gained success in Australian television series such as Cop Shop, The Henderson Kids, A Country Practice and Medivac.

He won the Australian Film Institute's Best Actor in Mini-Series award in 1987 for Vietnam, in which he co-starred with Nicole Kidman. In 1988, he played a rich would-be suitor in The Man from Snowy River II endeavouring to court Jessica Harrison (played by Sigrid Thornton).

Eadie was nominated again for his portrayal of World War II Academy Award-winning cameraman Damien Parer in John Duigan's Fragments of War, and in 2002 for Halifax f.p.

Theatre
Eadie has worked since with all the major Australian theatre companies with over 45 credits to his name. He has appeared in leading roles in plays as diverse as Tennessee Williams: "The Glass Menagerie" as The Gentleman Caller in a highly acclaimed performance (1985), "Cat on a Hot Tin Roof" as Brick, opposite Victoria Longley as Maggie and Bud Tingwell as Big Daddy (1991). He has played John Proctor in three separate productions of "The Crucible": RQTC 1990, STC 1993, and STCSA 2002. In Sydney's Botanical Gardens, he performed for three seasons as Oberon in Glenn Elston's production ofA Midsummer Night's Dream. He played Sam in the original cast of Mamma Mia! in Australia for two years. Eadie has been in the world premiere productions of Michael Gow's Furious, Hannie Raison's Two Brothers, Tommy Murphy's Holding the Man and the highly acclaimed Myth, Propaganda and Disaster in Nazi Germany and Contemporary America by Stephen Sewell.

Filmography
Cop Shop (TV series 1977)
Undercover (1983)
Kindred Spirits (TV movie 1984)
The Henderson Kids (TV series 1985)
Run Chrissie Run! (1986)
Jenny Kissed Me (1986)
Vietnam (TV mini-series 1987)
The Man from Snowy River II (1988)
Fragments of War: The Story of Damien Parer (TV movie 1988)
Celia (1989)
The Lancaster Miller Affair (TV mini-series 1990)
Yellowthread Street (TV series 1990)
Prisoners of the Sun (1990)
Aya (1990)
Tracks of Glory (TV mini-series 1992)
Embassy (TV series 1992)
A Country Practice (TV series 1993)
Halifax f.p.: Words Without Music (TV movie 1994)
Over the Hill (TV series 1994)
Dad and Dave: On Our Selection (1995)
G.P. (TV series 1989–1996)
Frontier (TV mini-series 1997)
Adrenalin (TV movie 1997)
A Difficult Woman (TV mini-series 1998)
Medivac (TV series 1996–1998)
Halifax f.p.: A Hate Worse Than Death (TV movie 2000)
Savage Honeymoon (2000)
The Lost World (TV series 2000)
BeastMaster (TV series 2000)
Still Life (short 2005)
Jewboy (2005)
The Society Murders (TV movie 2006)
Underbelly Files: The Man Who Got Away (TV movie 2011)

External links
 

1958 births
Living people
AACTA Award winners
Australian male television actors
Logie Award winners
Male actors from Sydney